The 1932 Stanley Cup Finals was a best-of-five series between the New York Rangers and the Toronto Maple Leafs. Toronto would win the series in three straight to win their first Stanley Cup as the Maple Leafs.

Game two was moved from New York to Boston due to a scheduling conflict at Madison Square Garden. It remains the only neutral site Stanley Cup Finals game to be played in the United States and the first neutral site Stanley Cup Finals game contested by two NHL teams.

Paths to the Finals
New York defeated the defending champion Canadiens in a best-of-five 3–1 to advance to the finals. The Leafs had to play  two total-goals series; 6–2 against 1931 finalists Chicago, and 4–3 against the Maroons.

Game summaries
New York would have to play game two in Boston, due to the circus having been booked into Madison Square Garden.

Toronto's 'Kid Line' of Jackson, Conacher and Primeau, in their first Finals, combined for eight goals.

Toronto's coach Dick Irvin made his second straight Finals appearance, having coached for Chicago in 1931.

Stanley Cup engraving
The 1932 Stanley Cup was presented to Maple Leafs captain Hap Day by NHL President Frank Calder following the Maple Leafs 6–4 win over the Rangers in game three.

The following Maple Leafs players and staff had their names engraved on the Stanley Cup

1931–32 Toronto Maple Leafs

See also
1931–32 NHL season

Notes

References
 Podnieks, Andrew; Hockey Hall of Fame (2004). Lord Stanley's Cup. Bolton, Ont.: Fenn Pub. pp 12, 50. 

Stanley Cup
Stanley Cup Finals
New York Rangers games
Toronto Maple Leafs games
Stanley Cup Finals
Ice hockey competitions in Boston
Ice hockey competitions in New York City
Ice hockey competitions in Toronto
Stanley Cup Finals
Stanley Cup Finals
Stanley Cup Finals
1930s in Boston
1930s in Toronto
Stanley Cup Finals
1930s in Manhattan
Boston Garden
Madison Square Garden